Ratu usually refers to a title used by Fijians of chiefly rank, and also to Javanese word to refer the leaders, especially kings or nobles.
Ratu is also a word from Indonesian language which means "queen".

Ratu may also refer to:

People
 Michael Ratu, a professional rugby league footballer who plays for Leeds Rhinos
 Pangeran Ratu, the ruler of Banten in Northwest Java, Indonesia
 Ratu Nasiganiyavi, an Australian winger for the NSW Waratahs rugby union club
 Ratu Bagus, a guru

Places
 Pelabuhan Ratu, an isolated fishing village at the south coast of West Java
 Ratu block, one of the twenty administrative blocks of Ranchi district, Jharkhand state, India
 Ratu, Ranchi, census town in Ranchi district, Jharkhand, India
 Ratu Boko, an archaeological site in Java
 Ratu Cakobau Park, a rugby union stadium in Nausori, Fiji
 Ratu Plaza, a shopping mall located in Central Jakarta, Indonesia
 Ratu, a village in Nepal
 Râtu River, another name for the Hopârta River in Romania

Other
 Ratu (band), an Indonesian female duo formed in 1999 and disbanded in 2007
 Ratu - Satu Penghargaan, a greatest hits album by Malaysian singer Ziana Zain
 Ratu Kadavulevu School, a school in Lodoni, Fiji